Phrynocarenum is a genus of darkling beetles in the family Tenebrionidae, found in the Neotropics.

Species
These species belong to the genus Phrynocarenum:
 Phrynocarenum strangulatum (Fairmaire, 1903)
 Phrynocarenum bruchianum Gebien, 1928

References

Tenebrionoidea